Erkan Can (born 1 November 1958) is a Turkish film and theatre actor, who has won the Golden Orange for Best Actor twice for his roles in On Board and Takva: A Man's Fear of God, and the Asia Pacific Screen Award for Best Performance by an Actor for Takva: A Man's Fear of God.

Biography 
Erkan Can began acting in 1974 at the age of 16 with the local Bursa State Theater and took acting classes at the Industrial Vocational High School. From 1982 to 1984 he undertook his compulsory military service. In 1985 he entered the theatre department of the Istanbul State Conservatory and made his first screen appearance, alongside Kemal Sunal, in Davacı (1986) directed by Zeki Ökten before graduating in 1990.

From 1991 to 1992 he performed with the Bakirkoy Municipal Theatre. He had his first major roles in the television series Mahallenin Muhtarlari (1992) and Yalancı (1993) for TRT. He had a minor appearance in Sokaktaki Adam (1995), directed by Biket İlhan, and a featured role in the short Bana Old and Wise'ı Çal (1998), directed by Çağan Irmak before achieving success with On Board (1998), directed by Serdar Akar, for which he won best actor awards at film festivals in Antalya and Ankara as well as the Orhan Anzac Award.

A series of film a television roles followed, including appearances in Vizontele (2001), directed by Yılmaz Erdoğan and Ömer Faruk Sorak, and Istanbul Tales (2005), directed by Ümit Ünal et al. Appearances in Destiny (2006), directed by Zeki Demirkubuz, and The Edge of Heaven (2006), directed by Fatih Akın, were followed by, what Rekin Teksoy describes as, a "convincing performance" in Takva: A Man's Fear of God (2007), directed by Özer Kızıltan, for which he won best actor awards at film festivals in Antalya and Nuremberg as well as the Asia Pacific Screen Award.

Filmography
 Davacı (1986) as Seyyar Satıcı
 Gençler (1989)
 Mahallenin Muhtarları (1992 TV series) as Temel
 Yalancı (1993 TV series) as Hulusi
 Sokaktaki Adam (1995)
 Bana Old and Wise'ı Çal (1998 short film) as Oguz
 On Board (1998) as the Captain
 Offside (2000) as Suat
 Vizontele (2001) as Mela Hüseyin
 Azad (2002 TV series)
 Toss-Up (2004) as Firuz
 Istanbul Tales (2005) as Darbukacı
 O Şimdi Mahkum (2005) as Kazım
 Kapıları Açmak (2005 television series) as Suphi Yılmaz
 Pamuk Prenses 2 (2005 short film) as Serdar
 Fırtına  (2006 TV series) as Oflu Hoca
 Destiny (2006) as İrfan
 The Edge of Heaven ( / ) (2006)
 Takva: A Man's Fear of God (2007) as Muharrem
 Bıçak Sırtı (2007) as Numan
 Düğün Şarkıcısı (2008) as Kudret
 Black Dogs Barking (2009)
 Kapalıçarşı (2009 TV series)
 Black and White (2010)
 Kara Para Aşk (2015) as Tayyar
 Love, Bitter (2015–2016 TV series)
 A Crazy Love (2017 TV series)
 My Dear Neighbor (2018 film) as Musa
 Müslüm (2018 film) as Limoncu Ali
 Çarpışma (2018–2019 TV series) as Haydar
 Love Likes Coincidences 2 (2020 film) as Kemal
 Tövbeler Olsun (2020 TV series) as Osman Necipli
 Saygı (2020 TV series) as Yavuz
 The Festival of Troubadours (2022 film) as Kul Yakup
 Tamirhane (2022 film)
 Kendi Yolumda (2022 film)
 Ben Bu Cihana Sığmazam (2022– TV series)
 Bursa Bülbülü (2023 film)
 Cenazemize Hoş Geldiniz (2023 film)

References

External links

Official Site

1958 births
People from Bursa
Living people
Turkish male film actors
Best Actor Golden Orange Award winners
Asia Pacific Screen Award winners